St. Elizabeth's Regional Medical Center is a general acute care licensed hospital located at 555 South 70th Street in Lincoln, Nebraska, United States. It is a part of Catholic Health Initiatives (CHI) hospital network.  It was founded in 1889 and had 258 staffed beds in 2022.

History 

This hospital was originally founded by the  Sisters of St. Francis of Perpetual Adoration in 1889.

References 

Hospitals in Nebraska
Buildings and structures in Lincoln, Nebraska